{{DISPLAYTITLE:C6H14N2O2}}
The molecular formula C6H14N2O2 (molar mass: 146.19 g/mol) may refer to:

 Lysine
 β-Lysine
 Meldonium
 3-Methylornithine
 N-Methylornithine

Molecular formulas